"Any Which Way" is the second single from Scissor Sisters' third studio album Night Work, and was released on September 20, 2010.
Australian pop singer Kylie Minogue provides uncredited backing vocals.

The b-side "Sex Exciter" features vocals & production from Alison Goldfrapp.

Track list
UK CD single
 "Any Which Way"
 "Sex Exciter"

UK 12" single
 "Any Which Way"
 "Any Which Way" (Carte Blanche Remix)

UK iTunes single / AUS Digital EP
 "Any Which Way"
 "Any Which Way" (7th Heaven Remix)
 "Any Which Way" (Carte Blanche Remix)
 "Any Which Way" (Live from the Roundhouse)

Charts

References 

2010 singles
Scissor Sisters songs
Song recordings produced by Stuart Price
2010 songs
Songs written by Stuart Price
Songs written by Babydaddy
Songs written by Ana Matronic
Songs written by Jake Shears
Polydor Records singles